Thottipalayam is a suburb Tiruppur in the Indian state of Tamil Nadu.

Demographics
 India census, Thottipalayam had a population of 24,969. Males constitute 53% of the population and females 47%. Thottipalayam has an average literacy rate of 68%, higher than the national average of 59.5%: male literacy is 76%, and female literacy is 59%. In Thottipalayam, 12% of the population is under 6 years of age.

References

Neighbourhoods and suburbs of Tiruppur